Oshoba (Russian and Tajik: Ошоба) is a village and jamoat in north-west Tajikistan. It is located in Asht District in Sughd Region. The jamoat has a total population of 21,260 (2015). It consists of 14 villages, including Oshoba (the seat) and Gudos.

Notes

References

Populated places in Sughd Region
Jamoats of Tajikistan